The Humono language, Kohumono (Bahumono, Ohumono), is an Upper Cross River language of Nigeria spoken by the Bahumono people in   Abi Local Government Area  of  Cross River State.

References

Languages of Nigeria
Upper Cross River languages